David is a 1997 television film by Five Mile River Films, starring Nathaniel Parker as King David. It was written by Larry Gross and directed by Robert Markowitz. The film was entirely shot in Morocco and was originally aired at TNT on 23 March 1997 as part of its Bible Collection.

Plot
David, a young Israelite shepherd, is chosen by God to help his people in the ongoing war between Israel and the Philistines. David defeats the giant Goliath, a Philistine champion, and becomes the second king of Israel. However, he is later seduced by power and lust. Adaptation of the biblical story.

Cast
Nathaniel Parker as David
Jonathan Pryce as Saul
Leonard Nimoy as Samuel
Sheryl Lee as Bathsheba
Ben Daniels as Jonathan
Richard Ashcroft as Abner
Maurice Roëves as Joab
Dominic Rowan as Absalom
Edward Hall as Amnon
Clara Bellar as Tamar
Gina Bellman as Michal
Franco Nero as Nathan
Gideon Turner as Young David

Reception
David was nominated for one Primetime Emmy Awards in the category of "Outstanding Sound Editing for a Miniseries or a Special". The film was also nominated for two OFTA Television Awards in the categories of "Best Miniseries" and "Best New Titles Sequence in a Motion Picture or Miniseries".

References

External links
 
 

1997 films
Bible Collection
TNT Network original films
Films directed by Robert Markowitz
Films scored by Carlo Siliotto
1990s English-language films